The Bowl of Baal is a 1975 science fiction novel by Robert Ames Bennet.  It was first published in book form in 1975 by Donald M. Grant, Publisher, Inc. in an edition of 1,600 copies.  The novel was originally serialized in All Around Magazine beginning in 1916.

Plot introduction
The novel adventures in the lost world of Baal in Arabia, which is inhabited by dinosaurs.

References

1975 American novels
Novels about dinosaurs
Novels first published in serial form
American science fiction novels
Works originally published in pulp magazines
Works originally published in American magazines
Lost world novels
Novels set in the Middle East
Donald M. Grant, Publisher books